The 2018–19 Tennessee State Tigers basketball team represented Tennessee State University during the 2018–19 NCAA Division I men's basketball season. The Tigers, led by first-year head coach Brian Collins, played their home games at the Gentry Complex in Nashville, Tennessee as members of the Ohio Valley Conference. They finished the season 9–21 overall, 6–12 during OVC play, and finishing in a four-way tie for seventh place. Since only the top eight teams in the conference qualify for the OVC tournament, tiebreakers left Tennessee State as the No. 9 seed, preventing them from participating.

Previous season
The Tigers finished the 2017–18 season 15–15, 10–8 in OVC play to finish in a tie for fifth place. They lost in the first round of the OVC tournament to Eastern Illinois.

On March 21, 2018, head coach Dana Ford left Tennessee State for the head coaching job at Missouri State. He finished at Tennessee State with a four-year record of 57–65. On March 26, the school announced that former Illinois State assistant coach Brian Collins had been hired as head coach.

Roster

Schedule and results

|-
!colspan=9 style=| Exhibition

|-
!colspan=9 style=| Non-conference regular season

|-
!colspan=9 style=| Ohio Valley Conference regular season

References

Tennessee State Tigers basketball seasons
Tennessee State
Tennessee State
Tennessee State